Messac (Gallo: Meczac) is a former commune in the Ille-et-Vilaine department of Brittany in northwestern France. On 1 January 2016, it was merged into the new commune Guipry-Messac.

Population
Inhabitants of Messac are called Messacois in French.

See also
Communes of the Ille-et-Vilaine department

References

External links

Former communes of Ille-et-Vilaine